This article is about music-related events in 1873.

Events 
April – The Fisk Jubilee Singers, an African American a cappella ensemble, perform before Queen Victoria during their first European tour.
August 27 – Sir Arthur Sullivan's oratorio The Light of the World (inspired by William Holman Hunt's painting of the same name) is premièred at the Birmingham Festival.
Joseph Parry becomes Professor of Music at the University of Wales, Aberystwyth.
Therese Malten makes her solo debut as Pamina in The Magic Flute at Dresden.

Published popular music 
 "The German Polka" by Gus Williams (vaudeville)
 "Good Sweet Ham" by Henry Hart
 "Home on the Range" w. Brewster M. Higley m. Daniel E. Kelley
 "I'se Gwine Back to Dixie" by Charles A. White (musician)
"Little sweetheart, come listen to me". Words and music by Arthur W. French
 "Silver Threads Among the Gold" w. Eben Eugene Rexford m. Hart Pease Danks

Classical music 
Johannes Brahms
Two String Quartets, Op. 51
Variations on a Theme by Haydn
Anton Bruckner – Symphony No. 3
Antonín Dvořák – String Quartet No. 5; String Quartet no. 6 in A
Hermann Goetz – Symphony in F, Op. 9 (premiered 1874; some sources give 1866 for composition however)
Pyotr Ilyich Tchaikovsky – The Tempest
Giuseppe Verdi – String Quartet in E minor

Opera 
Léo Delibes — Le roi l'a dit
Karel Miry — Muziek in t'huisgezin (opera in 1 act, libretto by N. Destanberg)

Musical theater 
 1492 Up to Date, Libretto by R. A. Barnet, music by Carl Pflueger

Births 
January 8 — Grace Van Studdiford, American stage actress and opera singer (d. 1927)
February 1 — Joseph Allard, fiddler and composer (d. 1947)
February 13 — Feodor Chaliapin, operatic bass (d. 1938)
February 27 — Enrico Caruso, operatic tenor (d. 1921)
March 19 — Max Reger, German composer (d. 1916)
April 1 — Sergei Rachmaninoff, Russian composer (d. 1943)
April 18 — Jean Roger-Ducasse, French composer (d. 1954)
May 1 — Harry Evans, composer (d. 1914)
June 1 — Ada Jones, singer (d. 1922)
June 16 — Antonina Nezhdanova, operatic soprano (d. 1950)
July 11 — Nat M. Wills, singer, comedian, and actor (d. 1917)
August 11 — J. Rosamond Johnson, US composer and singer
August 18 — Otto Harbach, lyricist (d. 1963)
September 21 — Papa Jack Laine, bandleader (d. 1966)
October 14 — José Serrano, composer (d. 1941)
October 23 — Ricardo Villa, composer (d. 1935)
November 1 — Charles Quef, French organist and composer (d. 1931)
November 16 — W. C. Handy, songwriter (d. 1958)
December 14 — Joseph Jongen, Belgian organist and composer (d. 1953)

Deaths 
January 3 — John Lodge Ellerton, composer (b. 1801)
January 28 — Henry Hugo Pierson, composer (b. 1815)
February 14 — Charles Samuel Bovy-Lysberg, composer and pianist (b. 1821)
March 31 — Domenico Donzelli, operatic tenor (b. 1790)
April 13 — Carlo Coccia, opera composer (b. 1782)
April 19 — Pierre-Chéri Lafont, actor and singer (b. 1797)
May 13 — Kašpar Mašek, composer (b. 1794)
June 2 — François George-Hainl, cellist, conductor and composer (b. 1807)
July 4 — Prince Józef Michal Poniatowski, operatic tenor and composer (b. 1816)
July 19 — Ferdinand David, violinist and composer (b. 1810)
August 26 — Karl Wilhelm, choral director (b. 1815)
September 26 — Roderich Benedix, librettist and singer (b. 1811)
October 6 — Friedrich Wieck, music teacher and father of Clara Schumann (b. 1785)
October 8 — Albrecht Agthe, music teacher (b. 1790)

References

 
19th century in music
Music by year